Ouahigouya is a department or commune of Yatenga Province in northern Burkina Faso. Its capital is the town of Ouahigouya. The department is coloured pink towards the centre of the Yatenga Province map, on the map just to one's right.

Towns and villages

The department of Ouahigouya is composed of the capital of same name, and another 37 villages: Aorema, Bapore, Bassaouassa, Bembela, Bissigaye, Bogoya, Bolongo, Bouri, Cissin, Ippo, Issigui, Komsila, Kouri, Lilligome, Mopeleguin, Mouni, Ouattinoma, Ouedrancin, Passogo, Pirgo, Poedogo, Rallo, Ramesse, Rikou, Risci, Roba, Sambtinga, Saye, Sissamba, Sodin, Somiaga, Soubo, Toessin, Yabonsgo, Youba, Zamioro e Zimba.

References

Departments of Burkina Faso
Yatenga Province